The International Journal of Pattern Recognition and Artificial Intelligence was founded in 1987 and is published by World Scientific. The journal covers developments in  artificial intelligence, and its sub-field, pattern recognition. This includes articles on image and language processing, robotics and neural networks.

Abstracting and indexing 
The journal is abstracted and indexed in:

 SciSearch
 ISI Alerting Services
 CompuMath Citation Index
 Current Contents/Engineering, Computing & Technology
 Inspec
 io-port.net
 Compendex
 Computer Abstracts

Publications established in 1987
Computer science journals
World Scientific academic journals
English-language journals